Select Essays in Anglo-American Legal History is a collection of 76 essays about the history of Anglo-American law. It was published, under the direction of a committee of the Association of American Law Schools, by Little, Brown and Company, in Boston, in three octavo volumes, from 1907 to 1909. 

It is an "important publication" which is "collected with conspicuous taste and judgement".

Volume 2
This volume includes "The Sources of English Law" by Heinrich Brunner.

References
Willoughby, W W. "Book Reviews". The American Political Science Review. Vol 2, No 3, May 1908. Page 471. JSTOR.  
"Book Reviews". The American Political Science Review. Vol 3, No 1, Feb 1909. Page 126. JSTOR.
Hazeltine, Harold D. "Reviews of Books". The American Historical Review. Vol 13, No 3, Apr 1908. Page 628. JSTOR.
Hazeltine, Harold D. "Reviews of Books". The American Historical Review. Vol 14, No 3, Apr 1909. Page 561. JSTOR.
H W B. "Book Reviews". (1907) 55 American Law Register 589. JSTOR.
R D J. "Book Reviews". (1909) 57 University of Pennsylvania Law Review and American Law Register 276. JSTOR.
"Book Reviews" (1909) 58 University of Pennsylvania Law Review and American Law Register 118. JSTOR.
W P A. "Reviews" (1908) 17 Yale Law Journal 217. JSTOR.
J H D. "Recent Legal Literature" (1908) 6 Michigan Law Review 359. JSTOR.
J H D. "Book Reviews" (1910) 8 Michigan Law Review 258. JSTOR.
"Book Reviews" (1907) 13 The Virginia Law Register 496. JSTOR.
"Book Reviews" (1909) 15 The Virginia Law Register 575. JSTOR.
W J L Jr. "Reviews" (1908) 18 Yale Law Journal 140. JSTOR.
A L C. "Book Reviews" (1910) 19 Yale Law Journal 215. JSTOR.
Spence, Kenneth M. "Book Reviews" (1909) 9 Columbia Law Review 458. JSTOR.
F M B. "Book Reviews" (1909) 9 Columbia Law Review 743. JSTOR.
N A. "Book Reviews" (1908) 21 Harvard Law Review 640. JSTOR.
N A. "Book Reviews" (1910) 23 Harvard Law Review 236. JSTOR.

External links

Books about legal history